Mario De Grassi may refer to:

 Mario De Grassi (footballer born 1919), Italian who played for Roma
 Mario De Grassi (footballer born 1937), Italian who played for Triestina